Les Gonds is a commune in the Charente-Maritime department in southwestern France.

Geography
The river Seugne forms most of the commune's eastern border, then flows into the Charente, which forms all of its northern border.

Population

See also
 Communes of the Charente-Maritime department

References

External links
 

Communes of Charente-Maritime